Plumer Block, also known as the Hancock Building, was a historic commercial building located at Franklin, Venango County, Pennsylvania.  It was built in 1866, and was a three-story, red brick building with a flat roof in the Victorian Italianate style.  It housed the first bank in Franklin, as well as numerous commercial enterprises and law offices.

It was listed on the National Register of Historic Places in 1978. It was delisted in 1986, after being demolished following a fire.

References

Commercial buildings on the National Register of Historic Places in Pennsylvania
Italianate architecture in Pennsylvania
Commercial buildings completed in 1866
Buildings and structures in Venango County, Pennsylvania
1866 establishments in Pennsylvania
National Register of Historic Places in Venango County, Pennsylvania